Nasimeh Gholami (born July 18, 1985 in Tehran, Iran) is  Iranian futsal player. She started playing futsal in 2001.
She is a current captain of Iran women's national futsal team since
2014.

International goals

Honors with National Team

1.Championship of Asia in 2018  

2.Third position in 2017 Olympic games

3.Championship of Asian Games 2015

4.Championship of west Asian games 2014

5.5th place of world futsal in 2014

6.Runner up in Olympic games 2012 

7.Participation in Russia tournaments  7times between 2010-2017

References

1985 births
Living people
Sportspeople from Tehran
Iranian women's footballers
Iran women's international footballers
Iranian women's futsal players
Women's association footballers not categorized by position